Vairamangalam LakshmiNarayanan (1928–2004) was a Carnatic musician from Tamil Nadu. He was a student of the famous singer T. K Rangachary.

As a singer LakshmiNarayanan was a versatile singer who could improvise and bring out the subtleties and nuances of ragas.  LakshimiNarayanan could sing elaborately in very obscure and rarely used ragas such as Nalinakanthi, Nayaki, Narayani, Natakapriya, Nagaswarali, Dharmavathi, Janaranjani, Andholika, etc.

Awards
LakshmiNarayanan received many awards for his talents. The Government of Tamil Nadu awarded his with the title Kalaimamani, shortly before his death,
for his contributions of music.  The Department of Culture of the Government of India conferred on him a Senior Fellowship in 2000, for his work on  Divya Prabandhams.

References

Male Carnatic singers
Carnatic singers
1928 births
2004 deaths
20th-century Indian male classical singers
Singers from Tamil Nadu